Piz Blaisun (3,200 m) is a mountain of the Albula Alps, located north of the Albula Pass in the canton of Graubünden. Its summit is the tripoint between the Val Tuors, the Val d'Alvra (Albula valley) and the Val d'Es-cha.

References

External links
 Piz Blaisun on Hikr

Mountains of Switzerland
Mountains of Graubünden
Mountains of the Alps
Alpine three-thousanders
Bergün Filisur
Zuoz